Crotalus estebanensis, commonly known as the San Esteban Island rattlesnake, is a pit viper species endemic to San Estéban Island, Mexico. Like all other pit vipers, it is venomous.

Description
Adults grow to a maximum reported length of 98.2 cm.

Geographic range
It s known only from the type locality, which is "San Estéban Island, Gulf of California, Mexico.

Conservation status
This species is classified as least concern  on the IUCN Red List of Threatened Species (v3.1, 2001). Species are listed as such due to their wide distribution, presumed large population, or because they are unlikely to be declining fast enough to qualify for listing in a more threatened category. The population trend is stable. Year assessed: 2007

References

External links
 

estebanensis
Fauna of Gulf of California islands